Asir is a region of Saudi Arabia.

Asir may also refer to:

Asir, Iran
Asir District
Asir Rural District

See also
 Asiri (disambiguation)